Euroscepticism, also spelled as Euroskepticism or EU-scepticism, is a political position involving criticism of the European Union (EU) and European integration. It ranges from those who oppose some EU institutions and policies, and seek reform (Eurorealism, Eurocritical, or soft Euroscepticism), to those who oppose EU membership and see the EU as unreformable (anti-European Unionism, anti-EUism, or hard Euroscepticism). The opposite of Euroscepticism is known as pro-Europeanism, or European Unionism.

The main drivers of Euroscepticism have been beliefs that integration undermines national sovereignty and the nation state, that the EU is elitist and lacks democratic legitimacy and transparency, that it is too bureaucratic and wasteful, that it encourages high levels of immigration, or perceptions that it is a neoliberal organisation serving the big business elite at the expense of the working class, being responsible for austerity and driving privatization.

Euroscepticism is found in groups across the political spectrum, both left-wing and right-wing, and is often found in populist parties. Although they criticise the EU for many of the same reasons, Eurosceptic left-wing populists focus more on economic issues, such as the European debt crisis and the Transatlantic Trade and Investment Partnership, while Eurosceptic right-wing populists focus more on nationalism and immigration, such as the European migrant crisis. The rise in radical-right parties since the 2000s is strongly linked to a rise in Euroscepticism.

Eurobarometer surveys of EU citizens show that trust in the EU and its institutions declined strongly from 2007 to 2015. In that period, it was consistently below 50%. A 2009 survey showed that support for EU membership was lowest in the United Kingdom (UK), Latvia, and Hungary. By 2016, the countries viewing the EU most unfavourably were the UK, Greece, France, and Spain. The 2016 United Kingdom European Union membership referendum resulted in a 51.9% vote in favour of leaving the EU (Brexit), a decision that came into effect on 31 January 2020.

Since 2015, trust in the EU has risen in most EU countries as a result of falling unemployment rates and the end of the migrant crisis. A post-2019 election Eurobarometer survey showed that 68% of citizens support the EU, the highest level since 1983; however, sentiment that things are not going in the right direction in the EU had increased to 50%.

Trust in the EU had increased significantly at the beginning of the COVID-19 pandemic with levels varying from member state to member state.

Reasoning
The main reasons for Euroscepticism include beliefs that:
 integration undermines national sovereignty and the nation state;
 the EU is elitist and lacks democratic legitimacy and transparency;
 the EU is too bureaucratic and wasteful;
 it encourages high levels of immigration;
 it is a neoliberal organisation serving the big business elite at the expense of the working class
 the EU is responsible for austerity;
 the EU is responsible for driving privatization.

Terminology
There can be considered to be several different types of Eurosceptic thought, which differ in the extent to which adherents reject integration between member states of the EU and in their reasons for doing so. Aleks Szczerbiak and Paul Taggart described two of these as hard and soft Euroscepticism. At the same time, some scholars have said that there is no clear line between the presumed hard and soft Euroscepticism. Cas Mudde and Petr Kopecky have said that if the demarcation line is the number of and which policies a party opposes, then the question arises of how many must a party oppose and which ones should a party oppose that makes them hard Eurosceptic instead of soft.

Hard Euroscepticism

According to Taggart and Szczerbiak, hard Euroscepticism or anti-EU-ism is "a principled opposition to the EU and European integration and therefore can be seen in parties who think that their countries should withdraw from membership, or whose policies towards the EU are tantamount to being opposed to the whole project of European integration as it is currently conceived." The Europe of Freedom and Direct Democracy group in the European Parliament, typified by such parties as the Brexit Party and UK Independence Party (UKIP), displays hard Euroscepticism. In western European EU member countries, hard Euroscepticism is currently a characteristic of many anti-establishment parties.

Some hard Eurosceptics regard their position as pragmatic rather than in principle. Additionally, Tony Benn, a left-wing Labour Party MP who fought against European integration in 1975 by opposing membership of the European Communities in that year's referendum on the issue, emphasised his opposition to xenophobia and his support of democracy, saying: "My view about the European Union has always been not that I am hostile to foreigners, but that I am in favour of democracy. ... I think they're building an empire there, they want us to be a part of their empire and I don't want that."

The Czech president Václav Klaus rejected the term Euroscepticism for its purported negative undertones, saying at a meeting in April 2012 that the expressions for a Eurosceptic and their opponent should be "a Euro-realist" and someone who is "Euro-naïve", respectively. François Asselineau of the French Popular Republican Union has criticised the use of the term 'sceptic' to describe hard Eurosceptics, and would rather advocate the use of the term "Euro opponent". He believes the use of the term 'sceptic' for soft Eurosceptics to be correct, since other Eurosceptic parties in France are "merely criticising" the EU without taking into account the fact that the Treaty of Rome can only be modified with a unanimous agreement of all the EU member states, something he considers impossible to achieve.

Soft Euroscepticism
Soft Euroscepticism reflects a support for the existence of, and membership of, a form of EU but with opposition to specific EU policies, or in Taggart's and Szczerbiak's words, "where there is NOT a principled objection to European integration or EU membership but where concerns on one (or a number) of policy areas lead to the expression of qualified opposition to the EU, or where there is a sense that 'national interest' is currently at odds with the EU's trajectory."

The European Conservatives and Reformists group, typified by centre-right parties such as Czech Civic Democratic Party, and the European United Left–Nordic Green Left, which is an alliance of the left-wing parties in the European Parliament, display soft Euroscepticism. The European Conservatives and Reformist Group does not itself use the descriptions Euroscepticism or soft Euroscepticism and instead describes its position as one of Eurorealism, a distinction described by Leruth as being one that is "quite subtle but should not be ignored" given the association of the term Euroscepticism with "European disintegration".  Leruth describes Eurorealism  as "a pragmatic, anti-federalist, and flexible vision of European integration where the principle of subsidiarity prevails, aiming to reform the current institutional framework to extend the role of national parliaments in the decision-making process." Steven states that "Eurorealism is a form of conservativism, first and foremost, rather than a form or Euroscepticism, even if it obviously very much also has the 'soft' Eurosceptic tendencies which are present in a number of ECR member parties."

Anti-Europeanism

While having some overlaps, Euroscepticism and anti-Europeanism are different. Euroscepticism is criticism of the European Union (EU) and European integration. Anti-Europeanism is sentiment or policies in opposition to Europe. For example, American exceptionalism in the United States has long led to criticism of European domestic policy, such as the size of the welfare state in European countries, and foreign policy, such as European countries that did not support the US-led 2003 invasion of Iraq.

Other terms

Some scholars consider the gradual difference in terminology between hard and soft Euroscepticism inadequate to accommodate the large differences in terms of political agenda; hard Euroscepticism has also been referred to as Europhobia as opposed to mere Euroscepticism. Other alternative names for hard and soft Euroscepticism include withdrawalist and reformist, respectively.

Eurobarometer surveys

About 43% of Europeans thought things were "going in the wrong direction" in the EU, compared with 23% who thought things were going "in the right direction" (11% "don't know"). About 32% of EU citizens tend to trust the EU as an institution, and about 55% do not tend to trust it (13% "don't know"). Distrust of the EU was highest in Greece (81%), Cyprus (72%), Austria (65%), France (65%), the United Kingdom (UK) and the Czech Republic (both 63%). Overall, more respondents distrusted their own government (66%) than they distrusted the EU (55%). Distrust of national government was highest in Greece (82%), Slovenia (80%), Portugal (79%), Cyprus (76%), and France (76%).

A Eurobarometer survey carried out four days prior to and six days after the 2016 United States presidential election revealed that the surprise victory of Donald Trump caused an increase in the popularity of the EU in Europe. The increase was strongest among the political right and among respondents who perceived their country as economically struggling.

A survey carried out in April 2018 for the European Parliament by Kantar Public consulting found that support for the EU was "the highest score ever measured since 1983". Support for the EU was up in 26 out of 28 EU countries, the exceptions being Germany and the UK, where support had dropped by about 2% since the previous survey. Almost half (48%) of the 27,601 EU citizens surveyed agreed that their voice counted in the EU, up from 37% in 2016, whereas 46% disagreed with this statement. Two-thirds (67%) of respondents felt that their country had benefited from EU membership and 60% said that being part of the bloc was a good thing, as opposed to 12% who felt the opposite. At the height of the EU's financial and economic crises in 2011, just 47% had been of the view that EU membership was a good thing. Support for EU membership was greatest in Malta (93%), Ireland (91%), Lithuania (90%), Poland (88%), Luxembourg (88%), Estonia (86%), and Denmark (84%), and lowest in Greece (57%), Bulgaria (57%), Cyprus (56%), Austria (54%), the United Kingdom (53%), and Italy (44%).

When asked which issues should be a priority for the European Parliament, survey respondents picked terrorism as the most pressing topic of discussion, ahead of youth unemployment and immigration. Not all countries shared the same priorities. Immigration topped the list in Italy (66% of citizens surveyed considered it a priority issue), Malta (65%), and Hungary (62%) but fighting youth unemployment and support for economic growth were top concerns in Spain, Greece, Portugal, Cyprus, and Croatia. Social protection of citizens was the top concern for Dutch, Swedish, and Danish respondents.

The April 2019 Eurobarometer showed that despite the challenges of the past years, and in cases such as the ongoing debate surrounding Brexit, possibly even because of it, the European sense of togetherness had not weakened, with 68% of respondents across the EU27 believing that their countries have benefited from being part of the EU, a historically high level since 1983. On the other hand, more Europeans (27%) were uncertain and saw the EU as "neither a good thing nor a bad thing", an increase in 19 countries. Despite the overall positive attitude towards the EU but in line with the uncertainty expressed by a growing number of Europeans, the feeling that things were not going in the right direction in both the EU and in their own countries had increased to 50% on EU average since September 2018.

History in the European Parliament

1999–2004
A study analysed voting records of the Fifth European Parliament and ranked groups, concluding: "Towards the top of the figure are the more pro-European parties (PES, EPP-ED, and ALDE), whereas towards the bottom of the figure are the more anti-European parties (EUL/NGL, G/EFA, UEN and EDD)."

2004–2009
In 2004, 37 Members of the European Parliament (MEPs) from the UK, Poland, Denmark and Sweden founded a new European Parliament group called "Independence and Democracy" from the old Europe of Democracies and Diversities (EDD) group.

The main goal of the ID group was to reject the proposed Treaty establishing a constitution for Europe. Some delegations within the group, notably that from UKIP, also advocated the complete withdrawal of their country from the EU, while others only wished to limit further European integration.

2009 elections
The elections of 2009 saw a significant fall in support in some areas for Eurosceptic parties, with all such MEPs from Poland, Denmark and Sweden losing their seats. In the UK, the Eurosceptic UKIP achieved second place in the election, finishing ahead of the governing Labour Party, and the British National Party (BNP) won its first-ever two MEPs. Although new members joined the ID group from Greece and the Netherlands, it was unclear whether the group would reform in the new parliament.

The ID group did reform, as the Europe of Freedom and Democracy (EFD) and is represented by 32 MEPs from nine countries.

2014 elections
The elections of 2014 saw a big anti-establishment vote in favour of Eurosceptic parties, which took around a quarter of the seats available. Those that came first their national elections included: UKIP in the UK (the first time since 1906 that a party other than Labour or the Conservatives had won a national vote), the National Front in France, the People's Party in Denmark and Syriza in Greece. Second places were taken by Sinn Féin in Ireland and the Five Star Movement in Italy. Herman Van Rompuy, the President of the European Council, agreed following the election to re-evaluate the economic area's agenda and to launch consultations on future policy areas with the 28 member states.

2019 elections
The elections of 2019 saw the centre-left and centre-right parties suffer significant losses including losing their overall majority, while green, pro-EU liberal, and some Eurosceptic right wing parties saw significant gains. Those that came first in their national elections included: the Brexit Party in the UK (which was only launched on 12 April 2019 by former UKIP leader Nigel Farage), the National Rally of France (formerly the National Front party until June 2018), Fidesz in Hungary, Lega in Italy, and Law and Justice in Poland. There were also notable falls in support for the Danish People's Party (previously topped the 2014 European election). Whilst Vox got elected with 3 seats, Spain's first Eurosceptic party and Belgium's Vlaams Belang rallied to gain second place after its poor 2014 result.

In EU member states

Austria

The Freedom Party of Austria (FPÖ), established in 1956, is a right-wing populist party that mainly attracts support from young people and workers. In 1989, it changed its stance over the EU to Euroscepticism. It opposed Austria joining the EU in 1994, and opposed the introduction of the euro in 1998. The party would like to leave the EU if it threatens to develop into a country, or if Turkey joins. The FPÖ received 20–27% of the national vote in the 1990s, and more recently received 18% in 2008. Following the 2017 Austrian legislative election, it has 51/183 National Council seats, 16/62 Federal Council seats, and 4/19 European Parliament seats.

The Bündnis Zukunft Österreich (BZÖ), established in 2005, is a socially conservative party that has always held Eurosceptic elements. In 2011 the party openly supported leaving the eurozone, and in 2012 it announced that it supported a full withdrawal from the European Union. The party has also called upon a referendum on the Lisbon Treaty. In polls it currently receives around 10–15%, although in one state it did receive 45% of the vote in 2009. Since the 2017 election, it has 0/183 National Council seats, 0/62 Federal Council seats, and 0/19 European Parliament seats.

Team Stronach, established in 2012, has campaigned to reform the European Union, as well as to replace the euro with an Austrian Euro. In 2012, it regularly received 8–10% support in national polls. Politicians from many different parties (including the Social Democratic Party and the BZÖ) as well as previous independents switched their allegiances to the new party upon creation. In two local elections in March 2013, it won 11% of the vote in Carinthia, and 10% of the vote in Lower Austria. It dissolved in 2017

Ewald Stadler, a former member of FPÖ (and later of BZÖ) was very Eurosceptic, but in 2011 became a member of the European Parliament due to the Lisbon Treaty. Before Stadler accepted the seat, this led to heavy critics by Jörg Leichtfried (SPÖ) "Stadler wants to just rescue his political career" because Stadler before mentioned he would never accept a seat as MEP if this was only due to the Lisbon Treaty. On 23 December 2013 he founded a conservative and Eurosceptic party called The Reform Conservatives, although it has been inactive since June 2016.

In the 2014 European Parliament election, the FPÖ increased its vote to 19.7% (up 7.0%), gaining 2 new MEPs, making a total of 4; the party came third, behind the ÖVP and the SPÖ. EU-STOP (the electoral alliance of the EU Withdrawal Party and the Neutral Free Austria Federation) polled 2.8%, gaining no seats, and the Reform Conservatives 1.2%, with Team Stronach putting up no candidates.

In the 2019 European Parliament election, the FPÖ came 3rd with 17.2% of the vote which was only slightly down on 2014 despite a scandal allegedly promising public contracts to a woman posing as a Russian backer. This precipitated the collapse of the ruling coalition and a new election being called.

Belgium
According to Eurostat, in the fall of 2018, 44% of Belgium people stated that they did not trust the European Union. The main Eurosceptic party in Belgium is Vlaams Belang which is active in the Dutch-speaking part of Belgium. In the 2014 European Parliament election, Belgium's Vlaams Belang lost over half of its previous vote share, polling 4.3% (down 5.5%) and losing 1 of its 2 members of the European Parliament. Despite the presence of Eurosceptic parties in Belgium, their weight is relatively low, as Belgium is predominantly Europeanist.

In 2019, Vlaams Belang stated in its program for the 2019 European Parliament election that it opposes the creation of a European state, would like to change the Economic and Monetary Union of the EU, and to end the Schengen Area, and refuses the accession of Turkey to the EU. More widely, the euro-sceptic arguments of the Vlaams Belang are based on four pillars:
 loss of sovereignty (for instance on economic sovereignty or on the binding legal order);
 the financial cost of the European Union;
 less competences for European Union;
 leaving the euro (even though in 2019 the party has changed its line and now wants to reform the euro). During the 2019 European Parliament election in Belgium, Vlaams Belang made substantial gains in both and polled in second place in Flemish region. At the beginning of 2019, the party was enrolled in the group of European Alliance of People and Nations in the European Parliament.

The New Flemish Alliance (N-VA) is a soft Eurosceptic party in the Dutch-speaking region of Belgium. Before 2010, the N-VA was pro-European and supported the idea of a democratic European confederation, but has since altered this policy to a more sceptical stance on further European integration and now calls for more democratic transparency within the EU, changes to the EU's common asylum policy and economic reforms to the Eurozone. The N-VA has obtained 26.8% of the votes or 4 seats of the Dutch-language college out of 12 (21 MEPs for Belgium) in the 2014 European Parliament election. In April 2019, it stood in European Conservatives and Reformists of the European Parliament, and can be considered a moderate Eurosceptic party.

In the French-speaking part of Belgium (Walloons), there are four Eurosceptic parties. The first one is Nation Movement, a far-right party which was a member of the Alliance for Peace and Freedom in the European Parliament. The second one is National Front, also a far right party which criticizes the European bureaucracy, intends to guarantee and preserve national independence and freedom in a liberated Europe; it also reaffirms the Christian roots of Europe. The third one is the People's Party, classified as right or extreme right. In its program for the European election of 2019 the People's Party proposes to abolish the European Commission, reduce the number of European parliamentarians and fight against the worker-posted directive. For this party, the EU must be led by a president elected by universal suffrage with clear but limited competences. It also wants to renegotiate the European Union treaties, restrict the judicial activism of the European Court of Human Rights. It declares itself against the Global Compact for Migration. The last one is the Parti libertarien. In early 2019, the party aims to reduce the powers of the European Commission, to abolish the Common Agricultural Policy, to abandon common defense projects, to simplify the exit procedure of the European Union, to reject federalism and to forbid the European Union to direct economic, fiscal or social policy, Finally, the Workers' Party of Belgium is an electoral and unitary party. It also intends to revise the European treaties considered too liberal. One of the Party's currencies is "The left that stings, against the Europe of money".

Bulgaria

Parties with mainly Eurosceptic views are NFSB, Attack, and VMRO – BND, which is a member of the Eurosceptic European Conservatives and Reformists).
Bulgaria's Minister of Finance, Simeon Djankov, stated in 2011 that ERM II membership to enter the Euro zone would be postponed until after the Eurozone crisis had stabilised.

In the 2014 European Parliament election Bulgaria remained overwhelmingly pro-EU, with the Eurosceptic Attack party receiving 3% of the vote, down 9%, with the splinter group National Front for the Salvation of Bulgaria taking 3; neither party secured any MEPs. A coalition between VMRO – BND and Bulgaria Without Censorship secured an MEP position for Angel Dzhambazki from IMRO, who is a soft Eurosceptic.

Followers of Eurosceptic Attack tore down and trampled the European flag on 3 March 2016 at a meeting of the party in the Bulgarian capital Sofia, dedicated to the commemoration of the 138th anniversary of the liberation of Bulgaria from the Ottoman Empire.

In the 2019 European Parliament election, Bulgaria remained overwhelmingly pro-EU with the ruling centre-right Gerb party winning with 31%, against 26% for the socialist BSP.

Croatia
Parties with Eurosceptic views are mainly small right-wing parties like Croatian Party of Rights, Croatian Party of Rights dr. Ante Starčević, Croatian Pure Party of Rights, Autochthonous Croatian Party of Rights, Croatian Christian Democratic Party and Only Croatia – Movement for Croatia.

The only parliamentary party that is vocally Eurosceptic is the Human Shield that won 5 out of 151 seats at the 2016 parliamentary election. Their position is generally considered to waver between hard and soft Euroscepticism; it requests thorough reform of the EU so that all member states would be perfectly equal.

In the 2019 European Parliament election, the Human Shield gained its first seat in the European Parliament with 6% of the vote putting it in 5th place.

Cyprus
Parties with mainly Eurosceptic views in Cyprus are the Progressive Party of Working People and ELAM.

In the 2019 European Parliament election, there was little change politically – the conservatives won narrowly, the ruling DISY taking two seats with 29%, followed by socialist AKEL (27.5%, two seats) with no seats taken by Eurosceptic parties.

Czech Republic

In May 2010, the Czech president Václav Klaus said that they "needn't hurry to enter the Eurozone".

Petr Mach, an economist, a close associate of president Václav Klaus and a member of the Civic Democratic Party between 1997 and 2007, founded the Free Citizens Party in 2009. The party aims to mainly attract dissatisfied Civic Democratic Party voters. At the time of the Lisbon Treaty ratification, they were actively campaigning against it, supported by the president Vaclav Klaus, who demanded opt-outs such as were granted to the United Kingdom and Poland, unlike the governing Civic Democratic Party, who endorsed it in the Chamber of Deputies. After the treaty has been ratified, Mach's party is in favour of withdrawing from the European Union completely. In the 2014 European Parliament election, the Free Citizens Party won one mandate and allied with UKIP in the Europe of Freedom and Direct Democracy (EFD).

The 2017 Czech legislative election brought into Parliament two soft eurosceptic parties: centre-right Civic Democratic Party (ODS) (11%) and far-left Communist Party of Bohemia and Moravia (KSČM) (8%). And one hard eurosceptic party, far-right Freedom and Direct Democracy (SPD) (11%).

An April 2016 survey by the CVVM Institute indicated that 25% of Czechs were satisfied with EU membership, down from 32% the previous year.

Dividends worth CZK 270 billion were paid to the foreign owners of Czech companies in 2017, which has become a political issue in the Czech Republic.

In the 2019 European Parliament election, the Civic Democratic Party saw its vote share rise to 15% and its seats doubled from 2 to 4. The Freedom and Direct Democracy party took 2 seats with 9% of the vote. KSČM dropped 2 seats leaving it with only one and a vote share of 7%

Denmark

The People's Movement against the EU only takes part in European Parliament elections and has one member in the European Parliament. The soft Eurosceptic June Movement, originally a split-off from the People's Movement against the EU, existed from 1992 to 2009.

In the Danish Parliament, the Red-Green Alliance previously advocated withdrawal from the EU, but in March 2019, the party announced it would no longer campaign for a referendum to leave the EU, pointing to Brexit illustrating the need for clarity before withdrawal can be considered. The Danish People's Party also advocates withdrawal, but says it supports some EU structures such as the internal market, and supported the EU-positive Liberal-Conservative coalition between 2001 and 2011 and again from 2015 to 2019.

The Socialist People's Party, minorities within the Social Liberal Party and Social Democratic Party, and some smaller parties were against accession to the European Union in 1972. Still in 1986, these parties advocated a no vote in the Single European Act referendum. Later, the Social Liberal Party changed to a strongly EU-positive party, and EU opposition within the Social Democratic Party faded. The Socialist People's Party were against the Amsterdam Treaty in 1998 and Denmark's joining the euro in 2000, but has become increasingly EU-positive, for example when MEP Margrete Auken left the European United Left–Nordic Green Left and joined The Greens–European Free Alliance in 2004.

In the 2014 European Parliament election, the Danish People's Party came first by a large margin with 27% of the vote, gaining 2 extra seats for a total of 4 MEPs. The People's Movement against the EU polled 8%, retaining its single MEP.

In the 2019 European Parliament election, the Danish People's Party lost around two-thirds of their previous vote share dropping from 4 seats to just 1. The People's Movement against the EU lost their seat and the Red-Green Alliance got one seat.

The 2019 Danish general election saw the emergence of a new hard Eurosceptic party Nye Borgerlige which supports Denmark leaving the EU. The party won four seats in parliament.

Estonia
The Independence Party and Centre Party were against accession to the EU, but only the Independence Party still wants Estonia to withdraw from the EU. The Conservative People's Party (EKRE) also has some Eurosceptic policies and increased its vote share from 4% in 2014 to 13% in the 2019 European Elections winning one seat.

Finland
The largest Eurosceptic party in Finland is the Finns Party. In the European Parliament election, 2014, the Finns Party increased their vote share by 3% to 13%, adding a second MEP. With their 39 seats, the Finns Party are also the second-biggest party in the 200-seat Finnish Eduskunta.

In Eurobarometer 77 (fieldwork in Spring 2012), 41% of Finns trusted the European Union (EU-27 average: 31%), 51% trusted The European Parliament (EU-27average: 40%), and 74% were in favour of the euro currency (EU-27 average: 52%).

In the European Parliament election, 2019, the Finns Party increased their vote share slightly from 13% to 14% and retained their 2 seats.

In its latest party platform written in 2019, the Finns Party is strongly opposed to further EU integration. The party proposes introducing a parallel currency within Finland in tandem with the Euro in order to phase out Finnish membership of the Eurozone and argues that while Finland is needed in the short-term in the European Parliament to defend Finland's interests, the country should also enact policies to help gradually withdraw Finland from the EU. During the 2018 Finnish presidential election, the Finns Party candidate Laura Huhtasaari stated that her campaign would support exiting the EU.

France

In France there are multiple parties that are Eurosceptic to different degrees, varying from advocating less EU intervention in national affairs, to advocating outright withdrawal from the EU and the Eurozone. These parties belong to all sides of the political spectrum, so the reasons for their Euroscepticism may differ. In the past many French people appeared to be uninterested in such matters, with only 40% of the French electorate voting in the 2009 European Parliament elections.

Right-wing Eurosceptic parties include the Gaullist Debout la République, and Mouvement pour la France, which was part of Libertas, a pan-European Eurosceptic party. In the 2009 European Parliament elections, Debout la République received 1.8% of the national vote, and Libertas 4.8%. In a similar way to some moderate parties, the French right and far-right in general are naturally opposed to the EU, as they criticise France's loss of political and economic sovereignty to a supranational entity. Some of these hard Eurosceptic parties include the Popular Republican Union and formerly the Front National (FN). Popular Republican Union seek France's withdrawal from the EU and the euro as well as France's withdrawal from NATO. The FN received 33.9% of the votes in the 2017 French presidential election, making it the largest Eurosceptic party in France. In June 2018, the National Front was renamed as National Rally (RN) and in 2019 dropped support for France leaving the European Union and the Eurozone from its manifesto, instead calling for "reform from within" the union.

Eurosceptic parties on the left in France tend to criticise what they see as the neoliberal agenda of the EU, as well as the elements of its structure which are undemocratic and seen as top-down. These parties include the Parti de Gauche and the French Communist Party, which formed the Front de Gauche for the 2009 European Parliament elections and received 6.3% of the votes. The leader of the Left Front defends a complete reform of the Monetary Union, rather than the withdrawal of France from the Eurozone. Some of the major far-left Eurosceptic parties in France include the New Anticapitalist Party which received 4.8% and Lutte Ouvrière which received 1.2%. The Citizen and Republican Movement, a left-wing Eurosceptic and souverainist party, have not participated in any elections for the European Parliament.

The party Chasse, Pêche, Nature & Traditions, is an agrarianist Eurosceptic party that says it is neither left nor right.

In the European Parliament election, 2014, the National Front won the elections with 24.9% of the vote, a swing of 18.6%, winning 24 seats, up from 3 previously. The former French President François Hollande had called for the EU to be reformed and for a scaling back of its power.

In the European Parliament election, 2019, the renamed National Rally won the elections with 23.3% of the vote, winning 22 seats, down from 23 previously when their vote share was 24.9%.

Germany

The Alternative for Germany (AfD) is Germany's largest Eurosceptic party. It was elected into the German Parliament with 94 seats in September 2017. Initially the AfD was a soft Eurosceptic party, that considered itself pro-Europe and pro-EU, but opposed the euro, which it believed had undermined European integration, and called for reforms to the Eurozone.

In the European Parliament election, 2014, the Alternative for Germany came 5th with 7% of the vote, winning 7 seats and is a member of the Eurosceptic European Conservatives and Reformists. The Alternative for Germany went on to take seats in three state legislatures in the Autumn of 2014.

The party became purely Eurosceptic in 2015, when an internal split occurred, leading to Frauke Petry's leadership and a more hard-line approach to the European Union, including its calling for an end for German Eurozone membership, withdrawal from EU common asylum policies and significantly reducing the power of the EU with some AfD members supporting a complete exit from the EU altogether.

In July 2015 an AfD splinter group created a new soft Eurosceptic party called Alliance for Progress and Renewal.

In the European Parliament election, 2019, the Alternative for Germany increased their vote share from 7% and 7 seats to 11% and 11 seats.

In the 2021 German Federal Election, AfD won 10.3% of the vote and 94 seats whereas in 2017, they received 12.6% of the vote and 83 seats; this meant they moved from third place to fifth place, falling behind the Green Party and FDP, both of which had been less popular than the AfD in 2017. Despite their overall electoral decline, the AfD still emerged as the largest in the states of Saxony and Thuringia, and saw a strong performance in eastern Germany.

Greece

Golden Dawn, Communist Party of Greece (KKE), Greek Solution, ANEL, Course of Freedom, Popular Unity, and LAOS have been the main Eurosceptic parties in Greece. According to the London School of Economics, Greece used to be the second most Eurosceptic country in the European Union, with 50% of Greeks thinking that their country has not benefited at all from the EU (only behind the UK). Meanwhile, 33% of Greeks viewed Greek membership in EU as a good thing, marginally ahead of the UK. 81% of Greeks felt that the EU was going in the wrong direction. These figures represented a major increase in Euroscepticism in Greece since 2009.

In June 2012, the Eurosceptic parties in Greece that were represented in the parliament before the Election in January 2015 (ANEL, Golden Dawn, KKE) got 45.8% of the votes and 40.3% of the seats in the parliament. In the legislative election of January 2015 the pro-European (left and right-wing) parties (ND, PASOK, Potami, KIDISO, EK and Prasinoi-DIMAR) got 43.3% of the votes. The Eurosceptic parties got 54.6%. The Eurosceptic left (KKE, ANTARSYA-MARS and KKE (M–L)/M–L KKE) got 42.6% of the votes and the Eurosceptic right (Golden Dawn, ANEL and LAOS) got 12.1% of the votes, with Syriza ahead with 36.3%. The Eurosceptic parties got 194 seats in the new parliament and the pro-EU parties got 106 seats.

According to the polls conducted in June and July 2015 (12 polls), the Eurosceptic left would get on average 48.0% (excluding extraparliamentary parties as ANTARSYA-MARS and KKE (m–l)/ML-KKE), the parliamentary pro-EU parties (Potami, New Democracy and PASOK) would get 33.8%, the extra-parliamentary (not represented in the Hellenic Parliament) pro-EU parties (KIDISO and EK) would get 4.4% and the Eurosceptic right would get 10.2% (excluding extraparliamentary parties, such as LAOS, not displayed on recent opinion polls). The soft Eurosceptic parties would get 42.3%, the hard Eurosceptic parties (including KKE, ANEL and Golden Dawn) would get 15.9%, and the pro-EU parties (including extra-parliamentary parties displayed on opinion polls) would get 38.3% of the votes.

In the European Parliament election, 2014, Syriza won the election with 26.6% of the vote (a swing of 21.9%) taking 6 seats (up 5), with Golden Dawn coming 3rd taking 3 seats, the Communist Party taking 2 seats and the Independent Greeks gaining their first ever seat. Syriza's leader Tsipras said he's not anti-European and does not want to leave the euro. According to The Economist, Tsipras is willing to negotiate with Greece's European partners, and it is believed a Syriza victory could encourage radical leftist parties across Europe. Alexis Tsipras vowed to reverse many of the austerity measures adopted by Greece since a series of bailouts began in 2010, at odds with the Eurogroup's positions.
The government coalition in Greece was composed by Syriza and ANEL (right-wing hard Eurosceptic party, led by Panos Kammenos, who is the current Minister of Defence).

Euroscepticism has softened in Greece as the economy improved. According to a research in early 2018, 68% of Greeks judge as positive the participation of Greece in the EU (instead of 53.5% in 2017).

In the European Parliament election, 2019, the New Democracy movement, beat the ruling left-wing Syriza formation with 33.1% and 23.8% of the vote respectively, maintaining Syriza's 6 seats and prompting the Prime Minister Alexis Tsipras to call a legislative election on 7 July 2019. In this election, which was won by ND, the pro-European parties (ND, SYRIZA, KINAL, MeRA25, and the extra-parliamentary Union of Centrists and Recreate Greece) got 84.9% of the vote and the Eurosceptic parties (KKE, Greek Solution, the extraparliamentary Golden Dawn and a host of other small mainly left-wing parties) got 15.1%. That drastic change in the balance is mostly the result of SYRIZA abandoning Euroscepticism.

Hungary

Viktor Orbán is the soft Eurosceptic Prime Minister of Hungary for the national-conservative Fidesz Party. Another Eurosceptic party that was present in Hungary was Jobbik, which until around 2016, it was identified as a radical and far-right party. Those far-right factions, who left Jobbik, they decided to form the Our Homeland Movement party.

In Hungary 39% of the population have a positive image of the EU, 20% have a negative image, and 40% neutral (1% "Don't know").

In the 2014 Hungarian parliamentary election, Fidesz got 44.5% of the votes, Jobbik got 20.5% of the votes and the communist Hungarian Workers' Party got 0.6% of the votes. Thus at the time, Eurosceptic parties in Hungary obtained 65.7% of the votes, one of the highest figures in Europe.

The green-liberal Politics Can Be Different (Lehet Más a Politika, LMP) classifies as a soft or reformist Eurosceptic party given its self-professed euro-critical stance. During the European parliamentary campaign of 2014 party Co-president András Schiffer described LMP as having a pronounced pro-integration position on environmental, wage and labour policy as supporting member state autonomy on the self-determination of local communities concerning land resources. So as to combat the differentiated integration of the multi-speed Europe which discriminates against Eastern and Southern member states, LMP would like to initiate an eco-social market economy within the union.

In the European Parliament election, 2019, Fidesz consolidated their position by increasing their vote share to 51.5% and adding a seat to take their tally to 13. Former Eurosceptic (now pro-European) Jobbik dropped to 6.3% of the votes, losing 2 of its 3 seats. The Momentum Movement, a newly created pro-European party, came 3rd with 9.3% of the vote, with the strongly pro-European Democratic Coalition coming second with 16.1% of the vote. Our Homeland Movement got to 3.3% of the votes, gaining no seats.

Ireland

Euroscepticism is a minority view in Ireland, with opinion polls from 2016 to 2018 indicating growing support for EU membership, moving from 70% to 92% in that time.

The Irish people initially voted against ratifying the Nice and Lisbon Treaties. Following renegotiations, second referendums on both were passed with approximately 2:1 majorities in both cases. Some commentators and smaller political groups questioned the validity of the Irish Government's decision to call second referendums.

The left-wing Irish republican party Sinn Féin expresses soft Eurosceptic positions on the current structure of the European Union and the direction in which it is moving.
The party expresses, "support for Europe-wide measures that promote and enhance human rights, equality and the all-Ireland agenda", but has a "principled opposition" to a European superstate. In its manifesto for the 2015 UK general election, Sinn Féin pledged that the party would campaign for the UK to stay within the EU. In the last European Parliament election in 2014, Sinn Féin won 3 seats coming second in seats and third in votes with 19.5% of the vote up 8.3%.

The Trotskyist organisation, the Socialist Party, supports Ireland leaving the EU and supported the Brexit result. It argues that the European Union is institutionally capitalist and neoliberal. The Socialist Party campaigned against the Lisbon and Nice Treaties and favours the foundation of an alternative Socialist European Union.

Italy

The Five Star Movement (M5S), an anti-establishment movement founded by comedian Beppe Grillo, originally set itself out as a Eurosceptic party. The M5S received 25.5% of vote in the 2013 general election, becoming the largest anti-establishment and Eurosceptic party in Europe. The party used to advocate a non-binding referendum on the withdrawal of Italy from the Eurozone (but not from the European Union) and the return to the lira. Since then, the party has toned down its eurosceptic rhetoric and such policy was rejected in 2018, and the M5S's leader has since stated that the "European Union is the Five Star Movement's home", clarifying that the party wants Italy to stay in the EU, even though it remains critical of some of its treaties. The M5S's popular support is distributed all across Italy: in the 2018 general election the party won 32.7% of the popular vote nationwide, and was particularly successful in central and southern Italy.

A party that retains a Eurosceptic identity is the Northern League (LN), a regionalist movement led by Matteo Salvini favouring Italy's exit from the Eurozone and the re-introduction of the lira. When in government, Lega approved the Treaty of Lisbon. The party won 6.2% of the vote in the 2014 European Parliament elections, but two of its leading members are presidents of Lombardy and Veneto (where Lega gained 40.9% of the vote in 2015).

In the 2014 European Parliament election the Five Star Movement came second, with 17 seats and 21.2% of the vote after contesting EP seats for the first time. Northern League had five seats and The Other Europe with Tsipras had three seats.

Other minor Eurosceptic organizations include right-wing political parties (e.g., Brothers of Italy, Tricolour Flame, New Force, National Front, CasaPound, National Movement for Sovereignty, the No Euro Movement), far-left political parties (e.g., the Communist Party of Marco Rizzo, the Italian Communist Party and the political movement Power to the People) and other political movements (e.g., the Sovereignist Front, MMT Italy). In addition, the European Union is criticized (especially for the austerity and the creation of the euro) by some left-wing thinkers, like the trade unionist Giorgio Cremaschi and the journalist Paolo Barnard, and some academics, such as the economists Alberto Bagnai and Vladimiro Giacché, the philosopher Diego Fusaro and the mathematician Marino Badiale.

According to the Standard Eurobarometer 87 conducted by the European Commission in spring 2017, 48% of Italians tend not to trust the European Union compared to 36% of Italians who do.

In the 2019 European election, the Italian Eurosceptic and souverainist right-wing, represented in large part by the League, increased its number of seats in the EP, but was not assigned any presidency in the committees of the European Parliament. Despite its national political alliance with the League during the Conte Cabinet, the Five Star Movement voted for Ursula von der Leyen, member of pro-EU Christian Democratic Union of Germany, as President of the European Commission.

In July 2020, senator Gianluigi Paragone formed Italexit, a new political party with a main goal to withdraw Italy from the European Union.

Latvia
The National Alliance (For Fatherland and Freedom/LNNK/All for Latvia!), Union of Greens and Farmers and For Latvia from the Heart are parties that are described by some political commentators as bearing soft Eurosceptic views. A small hard Eurosceptic party  exists, but it has failed to gain any administrative seats throughout history of its existence.

Lithuania
The Order and Justice party had mainly Eurosceptic views.

Luxembourg
The Alternative Democratic Reform Party is a soft Eurosceptic party. It is a member of the Alliance of European Conservatives and Reformists.

Malta
The Labour Party was not in favour of Malta entering the European Union. It was in favour of a partnership with the EU. After a long battle, the Nationalist Party led by Eddie Fenech Adami won the referendum and the following election, making Malta one of the states to enter the European Union on 1 May 2004. The party is now pro-European. Nowadays the People's Party often adopts Eurosceptic views.

Netherlands

Historically, the Netherlands have been a very pro-European country, being one of the six founding members of the European Coal and Steel Community in 1952, and campaigning with much effort to include the United Kingdom into the Community in the 1970s and others after that. It has become slightly more Eurosceptic in the 2000s, rejecting the European Constitution in 2005 and complaining about the relatively high financial investment into the Union or the democratic deficit amongst other issues.

A number of hard and soft eurosceptic parties have politicians elected to the Dutch House of Representatives and European Parliament which include:
 The nationalist Party for Freedom (founded in 2006) is a hard-eurosceptic party and wants the Netherlands to leave the EU in its entirety, because it believes the EU is undemocratic, costs money and cannot close the borders for immigrants.
 The conservative and right-wing populist Forum for Democracy (FvD) party was originally founded by Thierry Baudet as a think tank to campaign against the Association Agreement between the European Union and Ukraine. In 2016, the FvD was established as a fully fledged party. It is opposed to many of the policies of the European Union and calls for a referendum on Dutch membership in which it would endorse withdrawal.
 The conservative-liberal JA21 party (founded in 2021 as a splinter from the FvD) is opposed to Dutch participation several European Union agreements, including its immigration and asylum policies, and believes Dutch identity and self-determination should be prioritized above the EU. It supports Dutch withdrawal from the Eurozone and for the Netherlands to exit EU treaties it deems a threat to national sovereignty. 
 The Socialist Party believes the European Union has already brought Europe 50 years of peace and prosperity and argues that European co-operation is essential for tackling global problems like climate change and international crime. The SP opines that the current Union is dominated by the big businesses and the big countries, while the labour movement, consumer organisations and smaller companies are often left behind. "Neoliberal" measures have supposedly increased social inequality, and perhaps the Union is expanding too fast and taking on too much power in issues that should be dealt with on a national level.
 The conservative Protestant Reformed Political Party and the Christian Union favour co-operation within Europe, but reject a superstate, especially one that is dominated by Catholics, or that infringes on religious rights and/or privileges.
 The pensioner's interest party 50PLUS is moderately Eurosceptic.
 The ecologist Party for the Animals favours European co-operation, but believes the current EU does not respect animal rights enough and should have a more active policy on environment protection.
 The agrarian and rural interests Farmer–Citizen Movement (BBB) was founded in 2019 and is a soft-eurosceptic party. It supports membership of the EU for economic and trade purposes, but argues the political power of the EU should be stripped back so the bloc is closer to the model of the former EEC, wants reforms made to the Eurozone and is against the EU becoming a superstate.
 The classical liberal and conservative Belang van Nederland (founded in 2021 as a splinter from the FvD) wants to stop any further transfer of powers to the EU without referendums, calls for Dutch law to come before EU law and for a referendum on EU membership if polls show public support for one or if the EU assumes more powers.

A prominent former Eurosceptic party in the Netherlands was the Pim Fortuyn List (LPF) established by politician and academic Pim Fortuyn in 2002. The party campaigned to reduce Dutch financial contributions to the EU, was against Turkish membership and opposed what it saw as the excessive bureaucracy and threat to national sovereignty posed by the EU. During the 2002 general election, the LPF polled in second place with 17% of the vote. Following the assassination of Fortuyn in the run-up to the election, support for the party declined soon after and it was disbanded in 2008 with many of is former supporters transferring to the Party for Freedom.

Despite these concerns, in 2014 the majority of the Dutch electorate continued to support parties that favour ongoing European integration: the Social Democrats, the Christian Democrats, the Liberals, but most of all the (Liberal) Democrats.

In 2016, a substantial majority in a low-turnout referendum rejected the ratification of an EU trade and association treaty with Ukraine.

In the 2019 European Parliament election, Eurosceptic parties had mixed results with Geert Wilders' Party for Freedom losing all 4 of its seats taking only 3.5% of the vote. The new Forum for Democracy established in late 2016 took 11.0% of the vote and entered the European Parliament with 3 seats.

Poland

The main parties with Eurosceptic views are Law and Justice (PiS), United Poland (SP) and the Confederation Liberty and Independence and the main Eurosceptic politicians include Ryszard Bender, Andrzej Grzesik, Krzysztof Bosak, Dariusz Grabowski, Janusz Korwin-Mikke, Marian Kowalski, Paweł Kukiz, Zbigniew Ziobro, Anna Sobecka, Robert Winnicki, Artur Zawisza, and Stanisław Żółtek.

Former president of Poland Lech Kaczyński resisted giving his signature on behalf of Poland to the Treaty of Lisbon, objecting specifically to the Charter of Fundamental Rights of the European Union. Subsequently, Poland got an opt-out from this charter. As Polish President, Kaczyński also opposed the Polish government's intentions to join the euro.

In 2015, it was reported that Euroscepticism was growing in Poland, which was thought to be due to the "economic crisis, concern over perceived interference from Brussels and migration". Polish president Andrzej Duda indicated that he wished for Poland to step back from further EU integration. He suggested that the country should "hold a referendum on joining the euro, resist further integration and fight the EU's green policies", despite getting the largest share of EU cash.

In the 2019 European Parliament election, the Law and Justice party won the largest number of seats, with a vote share increase up from 31.8% to 45.4%, increasing its seats from 19 to 27.

In 2019, the former MEP Stanisław Żółtek created a political party called PolEXIT, whose flagship ideology is euroscepticism. Its candidate for president of Poland in the 2020 elections was the party's leader, Żółtek, who got 45 419 votes (0.23%), ranking 7th out of 11 candidates and did not qualify to the second round.

Portugal
The main Eurosceptic parties in Portugal are Chega, the Portuguese Communist Party (PCP), and Left Bloc (BE). Opinion polling in Portugal in 2015 indicated that 48 per cent tended not to trust the EU, while 79 per cent tended not to trust the Portuguese government (then led by Portugal Ahead). Eurosceptic political parties hold a combined total of 23 seats out of 230 in Portugal's parliament (BE 5, PCP 6, PNR 0, CHEGA 12) and a combined total of 4 out of Portugal's 21 seats in the European Parliament (PCP 2, BE 2, PNR 0, CHEGA 0).

In the last 2014 European Parliament election, the Portuguese Communist Party won three seats and the Left Bloc won one seat.

In the 2019 European Parliament election, Left Bloc took 9.8% and gained 1 seat, Portuguese Communist Party working in coalition with Ecologist Party "The Greens" took 6.9% and 2 seats and National Renovator Party (PNR) polled just 0.5%, with no seats.

2019 saw the emergence of a new Eurosceptic political party, Chega, who gained a seat in that year's legislative election. The party did not capture any seats in the 2019 European Parliament elections, but saw its leader André Ventura finish third in the 2021 presidential election, securing 11.9% of those voting.

In the 2022 Portuguese snap election, Chega got 7.2% of the vote and 12 out of the 230 seats in the Assembly of the Republic.

Romania

Several parties espousing Eurosceptic views exist on the right, such as the New Republic, the Greater Romania Party and Noua Dreaptă, but as of June 2020 none of these parties are represented in European Parliament. Euroscepticism is relatively unpopular in Romania, a 2015 survey found 65% of Romanians had a positive view of the country's EU membership.

The Eurosceptic parties remained unrepresented in the 2019 European Parliament election.

The soft Eurosceptic Alliance for the Union of Romanians, which was founded in September 2019, entered the Romanian parliament in 2020.

Slovakia
Parties with primarily Eurosceptic views represented in the National Council are the People's Party Our Slovakia, Republic, We Are Family. Prominent Slovak Eurosceptic politicians include Marian Kotleba, Milan Uhrík, Boris Kollár, Andrej Danko.

In the 2019 European Parliament election, People's Party Our Slovakia came 3rd securing 12.1% and winning their first 2 seats in the European Parliament. We Are Family took just over 3% and no seats.

Slovenia
Parties with mainly Eurosceptic views are Slovenian National Party and The Left. Neither won seats in the 2019 European Parliament election in Slovenia.

Spain

The process of Europeanization changed during the years in Spain. In 1986 Spain entered in the European Community. Since then, Spain has been one of the most Europeanist countries. Therefore, when Spain became part of the European Community, the country had a strong pro-Europeanist feeling, according to Eurobarometer, as it reflected a 60% of the population. In Spain different reasons explain its entrance to the European Community. On the one hand, democracy has just been established in Spain after Francisco Franco dictatorship. On the other hand, the main objectives of Spain were to achieve economic development, and also a social modernization. Spain was one of the few countries to vote Yes for the European Constitution in a referendum in February 2005, though by a lower margin in Catalonia and the Basque Country. In 2008, after the financial crisis reached Spain, the percentage of pro European persons started to fall. Thus, during the five years of the economic crisis, the Eurobarometer shows how the trust in the EU increasingly fell in Spain, and the confidence of the Spanish citizens in the European Union decreased for more than 50 points. Spain became one of the most Eurosceptic countries among all European Union Members, as it happened in pretty much European countries, where nationalist and eurosceptic characterised parties became stronger.

The historical two-parties system, composed by the conservative Partido Popular and the social-democratic Partido Socialista Obrero Español, collapsed. In the 2000s, the liberal Ciudadanos and leftist party Podemos became part of the political context, gaining electoral consensus, followed years later by ultranationalist party Vox. The new parties were the effect of the disaffection of most Spaniards towards politics and politicians, that increased for several reasons: firstly, corruption at all political levels, reaching the Royal Family too; secondly, recession intensified distrust of the population towards national government; thirdly, a phase of renovation of the autonomous regions which extended the distance between the National government and the Regional ones. Candidatura d'Unitat Popular, a left-wing to far-left political party with about 1,300 members advocates independence for Catalonia outside of the European Union. Up to 2014 European elections, there were no Spanish parties present in the Eurosceptic groups at the European Parliament. In the 2015 Spanish general election, Podemos became the first left-wing Eurosceptic political party to win seats in the Congress of Deputies, obtaining 69 seats, and in the 2019 Spanish general election, Vox became the first far-right Eurosceptic political party to win seats in the Congress of Deputies, obtaining 24 seats.

Sweden
The Left Party of Sweden is against accession to the eurozone and previously wanted Sweden to leave the European Union until 2019.

The nationalist and right-wing populist party Sweden Democrats support closer political, economic and military cooperation with neighboring Nordic and certain Northern European countries, but strongly oppose further EU integration and further transfers of Swedish sovereignty to the EU as a whole. The party is also against Swedish accession to the eurozone, the creation of a combined EU military budget and want to renegotiate Swedish membership of the Schengen Agreement.

The June List, a Eurosceptic list consisting of members from both the political right and left won three seats in the 2004 Elections to the European Parliament and sat in the EU-critical IND/DEM group in the European Parliament. The movement  favours a withdrawal from the EU.

Around 75% of the Riksdag members represent parties that officially supports the Sweden membership.

In the European Parliament election, 2014, the Sweden Democrats gained 2 seats with 9.7% of the vote, up 6.4%, and the Left Party took one seat with 6.3% of the vote.

In the European Parliament election, 2019, the Sweden Democrats increased from 2 to 3 seats with 15.3% of the vote, up from 9.7%, and the Left Party retained its one seat with 6.8% of the vote.

In winter 2019–2020, in connection with the request from "poor" member countries of much higher membership fees for "rich" member countries, for the reason of keeping support levels so "poor" countries wouldn't suffer from Brexit, where a "rich" country left the union in part due to high membership fees, a media and social media debate for a "Swexit" increased. This was still rejected by parties representing a majority of the parliament, with the COVID-19 pandemic quickly taking over the debate.

In other European countries

Armenia
Prosperous Armenia represents the main Eurosceptic party in Armenia. Following the 2018 Armenian parliamentary election, the party gained 26 seats in the National Assembly, becoming the official opposition. Following the 2021 Armenian parliamentary election, the party lost all political representation and currently acts as an extra-parliamentary force. The party was a member of the Alliance of Conservatives and Reformists in Europe.

Bosnia and Herzegovina
The Alliance of Independent Social Democrats is a Bosnian Serb political party in Bosnia and Herzegovina. Founded in 1996, it is the governing party in Bosnia and Herzegovina's entity called Republika Srpska, with its leader being Milorad Dodik.

Georgia
Georgian March is the main Eurosceptic party in Georgia. The party supports a slight distancing of Georgia from the West, as well as rejecting the country's entrance into NATO.

In March 2022, Georgia submitted a formal application for membership of the EU.

Iceland
The three main Eurosceptic parties in Iceland are the Independence Party, Left-Green Movement and the Progressive Party. The Independence Party and the Progressive Party won the parliamentary election in April 2013 and they have halted the current negotiations with the European Union regarding Icelandic membership and tabled a parliamentary resolution on 21 February 2014 to withdraw the application completely.

In 2017, Iceland's newly elected government announced that it would hold a vote in parliament on whether to hold a referendum on resuming EU membership negotiations. In November 2017 that government was replaced by a coalition of the Independence Party, the Left Green Movement and the Progressive Party; all of whom oppose membership. Only 11 out of 63 MPs are in favour of EU membership.

Moldova
The main Eurosceptic parties in Moldova are the left-wing Party of Socialists of the Republic of Moldova, which officially declared its main purpose to be the integration of Moldova in the Eurasian Economic Union, the Șor Party, and the Party of Communists of the Republic of Moldova, even if nowadays its leader speech became more soft on the issue of Euroscepticism. As of March 2022 all the parties are represented in Moldovan Parliament, with 37 MPs out of a total of 101 MPs.

In March 2022, Moldova submitted a formal application for membership of the EU.

Montenegro
The right-wing Democratic Front alliance are the main moderate eurosceptic subject in the Parliament of Montenegro, although its initially declaratively supported country's bid for accession to the European Union, all other parliamentary subjects officially advocates Montenegrin access to EU. The only parties that advocates Montenegro's rejecting the European integration are the extra-parliamentary right-wing populist to far-right parties, such as True Montenegro, Party of Serb Radicals, Democratic Party of Unity and the Serb List, all four are known for their close cooperation with the parliamentary Democratic Front.

North Macedonia
Since having come into national opposition, and amid disagreements in the Macedonia naming dispute, the VMRO-DPMNE – which does not endorse the name of North Macedonia, instead continuing to refer to Republic of Macedonia without qualifiers – no longer supports the country's candidacy for EU membership. It has subsequently declared its aspirations towards Russia.

Norway

Norway has rejected EU membership in two referendums, 1972 and 1994. The Centre Party, Christian Democratic Party, Socialist Left Party and Liberal Party were against EU membership in both referendums. The Liberal Party was particularly divided on the issue, and a large pro-EEC minority split off from the party before the 1972 referendum. In 2020, the Liberal Party officially reversed its position and since then, supports Norwegian EU membership.

Among the established political parties of Norway, the Centre Party, Socialist Left Party, and Red Party are also against Norway's current membership of the European Economic Area. In addition, the libertarian Capitalist Party and Christian-conservative The Christians, both of whom have never held a seat in the Norwegian parliament, are also against Norway's membership in the EEA.

Russia

Parties with mainly Eurosceptic views are the ruling United Russia, and opposition parties the Communist Party of the Russian Federation and Liberal Democratic Party of Russia.

Following the 2014 Crimean crisis, the European Union issued sanctions on the Russian Federation in response to what it regards as the "illegal" annexation of Crimea and "deliberate destabilisation" of a neighbouring sovereign country. In response to this, Alexey Borodavkin – Russia's permanent representative with the UN – said "The EU is committing a direct violation of human rights by its actions against Russia. The unilateral sanctions introduced against us are not only illegitimate according to international law, they also undermine Russian citizens' freedom of travel, freedom of development, freedom of work and others". In the same year, Russian president Vladimir Putin said: "What are the so-called European values? Maintaining the coup, the armed seizure of power and the suppression of dissent with the help of the armed forces?"

A February 2014 poll conducted by the Levada Center, Russia's largest independent polling organization, found that nearly 80% of Russian respondents had a "good" impression of the EU. This changed dramatically in 2014 with the Ukrainian crisis resulting in 70% taking a hostile view of the EU compared to 20% viewing it positively.

A Levada poll released in August 2018 found that 68% of Russians polled believe that Russia needs to dramatically improve relations with Western countries. 42% of Russian respondents said they had a positive view of the EU, up from 28% in May 2018.

San Marino
A referendum was held in the landlocked microstate on 20 October 2013 in which the citizens were asked whether the country should submit an application to join the European Union. The proposal was rejected because of a low turnout, even though 50.3% of voters approved it. The "Yes" campaign was supported by the main left-wing parties (Socialist Party, United Left) and the Union for the Republic whereas the Sammarinese Christian Democratic Party suggested voting with a blank ballot, the Popular Alliance declared itself neutral, and We Sammarinese and the RETE movement supported the "No" campaign. The Citizens' Rights Directive, which defines the right of free movement for the European citizens, may have been an important reason for those voting no.

Serbia

In Serbia, political parties with eurosceptic views tend to be right-orientated. The most notable examples are the ultranationalist Serbian Radical Party (SRS) which since its inception has opposed entering the European Union and the right-wing populist Dveri. Political parties such as the Democratic Party of Serbia (DSS) had pro-Western views and was initially supportive of the accession into the European Union but under the late 2000s leadership of Vojislav Koštunica they turned eurosceptic, and the Enough is Enough (DJB) political party, initially a liberal centrist party that also supported the accession turned towards the right-wing eurosceptic position shortly after 2018.

Historically, the Socialist Party of Serbia (SPS) and the Yugoslav Left (JUL) were the only two left-leaning political parties that imposed eurosceptic and anti-Western views. The ruling coalition in Serbia, For Our Children, which is predominantly pro-European orientated is also composed of two minor eurosceptic parties, the right-wing Serbian People's Party that advocates closer ties to Russia, and the left-leaning Movement of Socialists which was formed as the eurosceptic split from SPS in the 2000s.

Other minor political parties in Serbia that have eurosceptic views are Healthy Serbia, People's Freedom Movement, Russian Party, Love, Faith, Hope, Serbian Party Oathkeepers, Serbian Right and Leviathan Movement.

Switzerland

Switzerland has long been known for its neutrality in international politics. Swiss voters rejected EEA membership in 1992, and EU membership in 2001. Despite the passing of several referendums calling for closer relations between Switzerland and the European Union such as the adoption of bilateral treaties and the joining of the Schengen Area, a second referendum of the joining of the EEA or the EU is not expected, and the general public remains opposed to joining.

In February 2014, the Swiss voters narrowly approved a referendum limiting the freedom of movement of EU citizens to Switzerland.

Eurosceptic political parties include the Swiss People's Party, which is the largest political party in Switzerland, with 29.4% of the popular vote as of the 2015 federal election. Smaller Eurosceptic parties include, but are not limited to, the Federal Democratic Union, the Ticino League, and the Geneva Citizens' Movement, all of which are considered right-wing parties.

In addition, the Campaign for an Independent and Neutral Switzerland is a political organisation in Switzerland that is strongly opposed to Swiss membership of or further integration otherwise with the European Union.

Regionally, the German-speaking majority as well as the Italian-speaking areas are the most Eurosceptic, while French-speaking Switzerland tends to be more pro-European integration. In the 2001 referendum, the majority of French-speakers voted against EU membership. According to a 2016 survey conducted by M.I.S Trend and published in L'Hebdo, 69 percent of the Swiss population supports systematic border controls, and 53 percent want restrictions on the EU accord of the free movements of peoples and 14 percent want it completely abolished. 54% of the Swiss population said that if necessary, they would ultimately keep the freedom of movement of people's accord.

Turkey
The two main Eurosceptic parties are the far-right ultranationalist, Nationalist Movement Party (MHP), which secured 11.1% of votes, and 49 seats in the Parliament at the last election, and the Felicity Party (Saadet Partisi), a far-right Sunni Islamist party, which has no seats in the Parliament, as it only secured 0.7% of the votes in the last election, far below the 10% threshold necessary to be represented in the Parliament.

Many left-wing nationalist and far-left parties hold no seats at parliament but they control many activist and student movements in Turkey. The Patriotic Party (formerly called Workers' Party) consider the European Union as a front-runner of global imperialism.

Founded on 26 August 2021 under the leadership of Ümit Özdağ, Victory Party (Turkey) is a Turkish nationalist and anti-immigrant political party. It is represented by two deputies in the Turkish Grand National Assembly.  "The European Union does not want to negotiate with Turkey. We will not humiliate Turkey anymore." Özdağ said.

Ukraine

Parties with mainly Eurosceptic views are Opposition Platform – For Life, Opposition Bloc, Party of Shariy and Right Sector.

The far-right Ukrainian group Right Sector opposes joining the European Union. It regards the EU as an "oppressor" of European nations.

In the 2019 parliamentary election the Opposition Platform – For Life won 37 seats on the nationwide party list and 6 constituency seats.

The leader of the Party of Shariy Anatoly Shariy is one of the closest associates of Viktor Medvedchuk, whom Ukraine's special services suspect of financing terrorism.

United Kingdom

Euroscepticism in the United Kingdom has been a significant element in British politics ever since the inception of the European Economic Community (EEC), the predecessor to the EU. The European Union strongly divides the British public, political parties, media and civil society.

The UK Independence Party has backed the idea of the UK unilaterally leaving the European Union (Brexit) since its foundation in 1993. During the 23 June 2016 referendum on the issue, whilst the Conservatives had no official position, although its leader David Cameron was in favour of remaining in the EU albeit after some renegotiation of the terms of membership, the party remained profoundly split, as it always had been. The Labour Party officially supported remaining in the EU, although party leader Jeremy Corbyn did suggest early on in the campaign that he would consider withdrawal, a position he had personally advocated from the far left for many years, in fact throughout his period as a Labour MP. The Liberal Democrats were the most adamantly pro-EU party, and since the referendum, pro-Europeanism has been their main policy.

The referendum resulted in an overall vote to leave the EU, as opposed to remaining an EU member, by 51.9% to 48.1%, on a turnout of 72.2%. The vote was split between the constituent countries of the United Kingdom, with a majority in England and Wales voting to leave, and a majority in Scotland and Northern Ireland, as well as Gibraltar (a British Overseas Territory), voting to remain. As a result of the referendum, the UK Government notified the EU of its intention to withdraw on 29 March 2017 by invoking Article 50 of the Lisbon Treaty.

On 12 April 2019, a new Eurosceptic party, the Brexit Party was officially launched by former UK Independence Party Leader Nigel Farage.

In the 2019 European Parliament election, the Brexit Party topped the national poll by a large margin with 31.7% gaining 29 seats by running on a single policy of leaving the EU, versus the second-placed Liberal Democrats with 18.5% and 16 seats who promoted themselves as the party of Remain (the total vote for Remain-supporting parties was approximately the same as that for parties supporting a 'no-deal' Brexit). The Conservative Party suffered their lowest ever national vote share of 9.1% with just 4 seats following 3 years of Theresa May's unsuccessful Brexit negotiations. The Labour Party's ambiguous position on Brexit led to their vote share dropping significantly to 14.1% resulting in the loss of half their seats, down from 20 to 10. The rapid growth of the Brexit Party was a contributing factor to Theresa May announcing on 24 May that she would step down as Prime Minister on 7 June 2019. After the elections, the Eurosceptic Blue Collar Conservative caucus of Conservative MPs was formed.

Historically, the Conservative Party has expressed divided sentiments on the issue of EU membership, with the official stance changing with party leadership and individual MPs within the party variously favouring total withdrawal and remaining in the EU, while others adopted a position of soft Euroscepticism being supportive of membership but opposed to joining the eurozone and pursuing further integration. Until the 1980s, the Conservative Party was somewhat more pro-EU than the Labour Party: for example, in the 1971 House of Commons vote on whether the UK should join the European Economic Community, only 39 of the then 330 Conservative MPs were opposed to membership. When Margaret Thatcher came into power in 1979, the Conservative parties view on the EU saw a big shift from supporting the EU to becoming skeptical, thus campaigning against increasing its powers. Thatcher was seen as the "spiritual mother" of Euroscepticism and was one of the most important Eurosceptic voices in the United Kingdom, ultimately changing the Conservative parties view on the EU throughout the 1980s. In 2009 the Conservative Party actively campaigned against the Lisbon Treaty, which it believes would give away too much sovereignty to Brussels. Shadow Foreign Secretary William Hague stated that, should the treaty be in force by the time of an incoming Conservative government, he would "not let matters rest there". Following the election of Boris Johnson as leader in 2019, the Conservative Party became a strong supporter of the withdrawal of the United Kingdom from the European Union and its platform was changed to unanimously support EU withdrawal. In the 2019 general election the Conservative Party adopted a clear pro-Brexit platform in its manifesto.

Although often associated with being a cause on the right in the twenty-first century with the contemporary Labour Party supporting EU membership, there have been notable Eurosceptic politicians on the left of British politics, such as former Labour cabinet minister Tony Benn who held a longstanding opposition to British membership of the EU throughout his career. Other Labour MPs who have supported eurosceptic sentiments and British withdrawal have included Kate Hoey, Frank Field, Graham Stringer, Ian Austin, Tom Harris, Gisela Stuart and Austin Mitchell. Other figures on the left have included George Galloway and socialist politician and trade unionist Arthur Scargill who both endorsed Britain's exit from the European Union.

On 23 January 2020, the Parliament of the United Kingdom ratified a withdrawal agreement from the European Union, which was ratified by the EU Parliament on 30 January. On 31 January, the United Kingdom officially left the European Union after 47 years. During a transition period until 31 December 2020, the UK still followed EU rules and continued free trade and free movement for people within the European Union.

See also

 Anti-Federalism
 European Referendum Campaign
 Europeanism
 Fourth Reich
 Globalisation
 Institutions of the European Union
 Radical right in Europe
 States' rights (US)
 Subsidiarity
 United States of Europe
 Withdrawal from the European Union

References

References
 
 
 
 

 
Political neologisms
Politics of the European Union
Withdrawal from the European Union